Sopilka is a name applied to a variety of woodwind instruments of the flute family used by Ukrainian folk instrumentalists. Sopilka most commonly refers to a fife made of a variety of materials (but traditionally out of wood) and has six to ten finger holes. The term is also used to describe a related set of folk instruments similar to recorder, incorporating a fipple and having a constricted end.

Sopilkas are used by a variety of Ukrainian folkloric ensembles recreating the traditional music of the various sub-ethnicities in western Ukraine, most notably that of the Hutsuls of the Carpathian Mountains. Often employing several sopilkas in concert, a skilled performer can mimic a variety of sounds found in nature, including bird-calls and insects.

Modern usage
With the development of the 10 hole fingering instruments sopilkas became part of the music education system in Ukraine. Pop groups began to use the instrument in their performances. The first was the folk-rock group Kobza. More recently, the sopilka has found its way into the music of Ruslana, Haydamaky, the Kubasonics and other contemporary bands like Go_A or Kalush which explore Ukrainian themes.

See also
Ukrainian folk music

References 
 Ukrainian Folk Wind Instruments
 
 Samples and Pictures of Ukrainian Instruments
 Sopilka: Ukrainian Chromatic Recorder

Sopilka==Sources==

Dverij, R. - Shkola hry na khromatychnii sopiltsi - Lviv, 2008. - Part 1 - 72 pages, part 2 - 68 pages, part 3 - 64 pages.
Humeniuk, A. - Ukrainski narodni muzychni instrumenty - Kyiv: Naukova dumka, 1967
Lander, N.S. - Sopilka, Ukrainian Chromatic Recorder - Hobart, 2022.
Mizynec, V. - Ukrainian Folk Instruments - Melbourne: Bayda books, 1984
Cherkaskyi, L. - Ukrainski narodni muzychni instrumenty - Tekhnika, Kyiv, Ukraine, 2003 - 262 pages. 

End-blown flutes
Ukrainian musical instruments